Nam phrik phao is a type of Thai spicy chili sauce known as nam phrik, one of the chilli pastes used in Thai cuisine. It contains chilli peppers, shallots, garlic, fermented shrimp, tamarind, fish sauce and palm sugar.

See also 
 Jeow bong

External links
  Leela on January 21, 2011 in She Deglutenizes http://shesimmers.com/2011/01/nam-prik-pao-thai-chilli-jam-secret.html
 ThaiFoodMaster July 18, 2010 http://www.thaifoodmaster.com/origin/traditional/1355
 Leela on March 20, 2011 in She Deglutenizes http://shesimmers.com/2011/03/nam-prik-pao-recipe-%E0%B8%99%E0%B9%89%E0%B8%B3%E0%B8%9E%E0%B8%A3%E0%B8%B4%E0%B8%81%E0%B9%80%E0%B8%9C%E0%B8%B2-thai-chilli-jam.html
 Inquiringchef 3/2/2016 http://inquiringchef.com/nam-prik-pao-thai-chili-paste/

Chili paste
Dips (food)
Thai cuisine